St Nicholas’ Church, Radford is a parish church in the Church of England in Radford, Coventry.

History

The previous church was built to the designs of George Taylor of Coventry, as a chapel of ease to Holy Trinity Church, Coventry and consecrated on 29 September 1874 by Henry Philpott, the Bishop of Worcester. It comprised a chancel with vestry on the north side, and a nave with the entrance porch at the west end of the south side. There was accommodation for 300 worshippers. The stone font was made by Mr Seager of Coventry. It was destroyed on 14 November 1940 during the Coventry Blitz and four of the fire watchers were killed. The destruction left only one course of stones standing. Some of the people seeking shelter in the church crypt were killed or injured.

The new church was started in 1955 by the architect Richard Twentyman and consecrated by the Bishop of Coventry. The construction is of reinforced concrete faced with yellow brick. The side walls slope inwards at an angle of 10 degrees. The nave and chancel are undivided. The brick campanile contains two bells. The north aisle includes a Lady Chapel and baptistery. The stone font was rescued from the old church of 1874.

It is in the Anglo-Catholic tradition of the Church of England and receives alternative episcopal oversight from the Bishop of Ebbsfleet.

The church has been designated by the City of Coventry as a Building of Special Architectural or Historic Interest.

Services have moved into the church hall, and the main building is to be demolished.

Organ

The church is equipped with a pipe organ by Nicholson dating from 1955. A specification of the organ can be found on the National Pipe Organ Register.

References

Church of England church buildings in the West Midlands (county)
British churches bombed by the Luftwaffe
Rebuilt churches in the United Kingdom
Churches completed in 1956
20th-century Church of England church buildings
Coventry
Churches in Coventry
Richard Twentyman